This is an exhaustive list of cases originating in Canada decided by the Judicial Committee of the Privy Council, in Britain.

From 1867 to 1949, the Judicial Committee of the Privy Council was the highest court of appeal for Canada (and, separately, for Newfoundland, which did not join Canada as a province until 1949). During this period, its decisions on Canadian appeals were binding precedent on all Canadian courts, including the Supreme Court of Canada. Any decisions from this era that the Supreme Court of Canada has not overruled since gaining appellate supremacy in 1949 remain good law, and continue to bind all Canadian courts other than the Supreme Court. As Canada's ultimate judicial authority for most of its first century as a country following Confederation, the Judicial Committee had a considerable influence on the development of Canadian law, particularly constitutional law, where the living tree doctrine first laid down in Edwards v Canada (AG) remains a defining feature of Canadian constitutional interpretation. 

The Parliament of Canada abolished appeals to the Judicial Committee of criminal cases in 1933 and civil cases in 1949. Ongoing cases that had begun before those dates remained appealable to the Judicial Committee. The final Judicial Committee ruling on a Canadian case was rendered in 1959, in Ponoka-Calmar Oils v Wakefield, an appeal from the Supreme Court.

1867–1869

List of cases
For a detailed list of all cases during this period, please see:  List of Canadian appeals to the Judicial Committee of the Privy Council, 1867–1869.

Summary by year and result

Summary by province

1870–1879

List of cases
For a detailed list of all cases during this period, please see:  List of Canadian appeals to the Judicial Committee of the Privy Council, 1870–1879.

Summary by year and result

Summary by province and court appealed from

1880–1889

List of cases
For a detailed list of all cases during this period, please see:  List of Canadian appeals to the Judicial Committee of the Privy Council, 1880–1889.

Summary by year and result

Summary by jurisdiction and court appealed from

1890–1899

List of cases
For a detailed list of all cases during this period, please see:  List of Canadian appeals to the Judicial Committee of the Privy Council, 1890–1899.

Summary by year and result

Summary by jurisdiction and court appealed from

1900–1909

List of cases
For a detailed list of all cases during this period, please see:  List of Canadian appeals to the Judicial Committee of the Privy Council, 1900–1909.

Summary by year and result

Summary by jurisdiction and court appealed from

1910–1919

List of cases
For a detailed list of all cases during this period, please see:  List of Canadian appeals to the Judicial Committee of the Privy Council, 1910–1919.

Summary by year and result

Summary by jurisdiction and court appealed from

1920–1929

List of cases
For a detailed list of all cases during this period, please see:  List of Canadian appeals to the Judicial Committee of the Privy Council, 1920–1929.

Summary by year and result

Summary by jurisdiction and court appealed from

1930–1939

List of cases
For a detailed list of all cases during this period, please see:  List of Canadian appeals to the Judicial Committee of the Privy Council, 1930–1939.

Summary by year and result

Summary by jurisdiction and court appealed from

1940–1949

List of cases
For a detailed list of all cases during this period, please see:  List of Canadian appeals to the Judicial Committee of the Privy Council, 1940–1949.

Summary by year and result

Summary by jurisdiction and court appealed from

1950–1959

List of cases
For a detailed list of all cases during this period, please see:  List of Canadian appeals to the Judicial Committee of the Privy Council, 1950–1959.

Summary by year and result

Summary by jurisdiction and court appealed from

See also
 List of Supreme Court of Canada cases
 List of House of Lords cases

References

Sources
British and Irish Legal Information Institute:  Privy Council Decisions

External links
British and Irish Legal Information Institute

Canadian case law lists
Canada